The 2022 FIBA U20 Women's European Championship was be the 19th edition of the Women's European basketball championship for national under-20 teams. It was played from 8 to 16 July 2022 in Sopron, Hungary. Spain women's national under-20 basketball team won the tournament and became the European champions for the ninth time.

Participating teams
After the 2022 Russian invasion of Ukraine, Russia was expelled from the competition. They were replaced by Portugal, 14th in the 2019 Division A edition.

 
   (Winners, 2019 FIBA U20 Women's European Championship Division B)
 
   (Runners-up, 2019 FIBA U20 Women's European Championship Division B)
 
 
   (Third place, 2019 FIBA U20 Women's European Championship Division B)

First round
The draw of the first round was held on 15 February 2022 in Freising, Germany.

In the first round, the teams were drawn into four groups of four. All teams advance to the playoffs.

Group A

Group B

Group C

Group D

Playoffs

Main bracket

5th place bracket

9th place bracket

13th place bracket

Final standings

References

External links
Home page

2022
2022–23 in European women's basketball
International women's basketball competitions hosted by Hungary
International youth basketball competitions hosted by Hungary
2022 in youth sport
July 2022 sports events in Hungary
Sport in Sopron